The discography of The Good, the Bad & the Queen, a British art rock supergroup formed in London in 2005. The group consisted of vocalist and instrumentalist Damon Albarn, bassist Paul Simonon, guitarist Simon Tong, and drummer Tony Allen. Consists of two studio albums, an extended play, five singles, a box set, four music videos and ten promotional music videos.

The members of the band had already worked in notorious bands, including Albarn (Blur's vocalist and co-creator of Gorillaz), Simonon (The Clash's bassist), Tong (The Verve's guitarist) and Allen (Fela Kuti's drummer). The Good, the Bad & the Queen has released two studio albums, The Good, the Bad & the Queen (2007) and Merrie Land (2018).

Albums

Studio albums

Extended plays

Box sets

Singles

Music videos

Promotional music videos 
All promotional music videos are directed by The Good, the Bad & the Queen and were released in 2018 in Merrie Land album.

 "Merrie Land"
 "Gun to the Head"
 "Nineteen Seventeen"
 "The Great Fire"
 "Lady Boston"
 "Drifters & Trawlers"
 "The Truce of Twilight"
 "Ribbons"
 "The Last Man to Leave"
 "The Poison Tree"

Notes

See also 
 Blur discography
 The Clash discography
 Damon Albarn discography
 Fela Kuti discography
 Gorillaz discography
 The Verve discography

References

External links 
 Official website

 

Discographies of British artists